is a Japanese rock band formed in Tokyo in September 2006.

Summary
The band consists of Etsuko Yakushimaru (lead vocals, producer, original instruments, artwork), Seiichi Nagai (guitar), Masaru Yoshida (bass), Motoki Yamaguchi (drums). The band is known for not revealing much about their private lives. Media coverage concerning the band is minimal and taking photos during live occasions is strictly forbidden. The band derives its influences from genres such as kayōkyoku, group sounds and post-rock. Song titles as well as lyrics often involve plays on words and pop culture references. According to guitarist Seiichi Nagai, the band composes most of their music together.

The debut mini-album, Chiffon Shugi was the winner of the 1st All Japan CD Shop Award, and their second album, Hi-Fi Shinsho ranked No. 7 in the Oricon weekly chart.

The third album, Synchroniciteen was released in April 2010. The album consists of both all-new songs and songs already performed live during numerous live events.

The fourth album, Tadashii Sōtaisei Riron, had a planned release date of March 23, 2011. However, it was postponed due to the 2011 Tōhoku earthquake and tsunami and was finally released on April 27, 2011. Tadashii Sōtaisei Riron is a remix album with three new songs and a total of ten remixes of already released Sōtaisei Riron songs. (Remixed by Matthew Herbert, Fennesz, Arto Lindsay, Ryuichi Sakamoto, Cornelius (musician) and more)

The fifth album, TOWN AGE was released in July 2013. After the release of the album, a concert with My Bloody Valentine (band) was also held in Tokyo International Forum.

"Spectrum"(as '''Sōtaisei Riron x Jeff Mills''') and "Tama Tama Newtown (2DK session)" were released on 2015.

The sixth album, Tensei Jingle was released in April 2016. The album received praise from figures including Ryuichi Sakamoto, Jeff Mills, Penguin Cafe, Kiyoshi Kurosawa.

NEO-FUTURE, a single, was released in October 2018. A live album Shiraberu Sōtaisei Riron was released in July 2019.

Band members
 – lead vocals, producer, dimtakt (original instruments), artwork
Yakushimaru is an artist, musician, producer, lyricist, composer, arranger, and vocalist. Broadly active, from pop music to experimental music and art. Consistently independent in her wide-ranging activities, which also include drawing, installation art, media art, poetry and other literature, and recitation. Producing numerous projects and artists, including her band, Soutaiseiriron. While appearing in the music charts with many hit songs, she has also created a project that involved the use of satellite, biological data and biotechnology, a song-generating robot powered by artificial intelligence and her own voice, an independently-developed VR system, and original electronic musical instruments. Major recent activities include exhibitions at Mori Art Museum, Toyota Municipal Museum of Art, KENPOKU ART 2016, and Yamaguchi Center for Arts and Media [YCAM]. Her Tensei Jingle and Flying Tentacles albums, both released in 2016, received praise from figures including Ryuichi Sakamoto, Jeff Mills, Fennesz, Penguin Cafe, Kiyoshi Kurosawa and Toh EnJoe. She uses the alias  in songwriting and composition work. Yakushimaru is an Ars Electronica STARTS Prize 2017 Grand prize winner.

 – guitar
 – bass
 – drums

Past members

  – keyboard, percussion
 – bass (went on to form the band Shudan Kojo)
 – drums (went on to form the band Shudan Kojo)

Nishiura is also active in the bands Luminous Orange and Mass of the Fermenting Dregs as a support drummer.

Discography

Studio albums
 Hi-Fi Shinsho (or Hi-Fi Anatomia) (2009)
 Synchroniciteen (2010)
 TOWN AGE (2013)
 Tensei Jingle (2016)

EPs
 Chiffon Shugi (2008)

Remix albums
 Tadashii Sōtaisei Riron (2011)

Live albums
 Shiraberu Sōtaisei Riron (2019)

Collaboration singles
 "Our Music" (2010) (as Sōtaisei Riron & Keiichirō Shibuya)
 "Ranbō to Taiki" (2010) (as Sōtaisei Riron & Yoshio Ōtani)

Singles
"YOU & IDOL / KIds No Return” (single ver.) (2013)
 "Spectrum" (2015) (as Sōtaisei Riron x Jeff Mills)
"Tama Tama Newtown (2DK session)" (2015)
"Ultra Soda" (2015)
"NEO-FUTURE" (2018)

Notes and references

External links
 Mirai Records
MIRAI records - Official: Soutaiseiriron / Yakushimaru Etsuko on Instagram
 
 
MIRAI records - Official: Soutaiseiriron / Yakushimaru Etsuko on Facebook

Japanese rock music groups
Japanese pop rock music groups
Musical groups established in 2006
2006 establishments in Japan
Musical groups from Tokyo